Hell Still on Earth is a collaborative extended play by Griselda Records's Conway and Mobb Deep's own Prodigy, released on September 12, 2016, by Griselda Records. Its title references Mobb Deep's third album, titled Hell on Earth.

Track listing
All tracks are produced by Daringer.

References

2016 EPs
Hip hop albums by American artists
Albums produced by Daringer (producer)
Griselda Records EPs